The Ides of March is an epistolary novel by Thornton Wilder that was published in 1948. It is, in the author's words, 'a fantasia on certain events and persons of the last days of the Roman republic. Historical reconstruction is not among the primary aims of this work'. The novel deals with the characters and events leading to, and culminating in, the assassination of Julius Caesar.

Context
The novel is divided into four books, each of which starts earlier and ends later than the previous book.
Catullus' poems and the closing section by Suetonius are the only documents of the book which are not imagined; however, many of the events are historical, such as Cleopatra's visit to Rome.

Though the novel describes events leading up to Caesar's assassination on 15 March 44 BC, a number of earlier events are described as if they were contemporary.  Thus, the violation of the Bona Dea mysteries by Publius Clodius Pulcher, Caesar's subsequent divorce of his second wife Pompeia, and the circulation of two poems by Catullus suggesting that Caesar and his engineer, Mamurra, were lovers (and Catallus's subsequent apology) are transposed from December 62 BC to December 45 BC. In addition, many of the characters depicted as living in the novel were actually dead by 44 BC, including M. Porcius Cato (in 46 BC), Catullus (in c. 54 BC), Julia (in 69 BC) and Clodius (in 52 BC).

Major characters
Note that names, relationships, and events are described as they occur in the novel, and are not necessarily historically accurate.

 Julius Caesar, ruler of Rome
 Lucius Mamilius Turrinus, a friend of Caesar's, now living in retirement; various characters write to him but he never replies.
 Clodia, an extremely angry, intelligent and fascinating woman; the ridicule of Roman society, she lives a life of scandal.
 Publius Clodius Pulcher, her brigand brother; he plays only a minor role.
 Cicero, an orator, statesman, political theorist, lawyer and philosopher
 Julia Marcia, Caesar's aunt.
 Pompeia, Caesar's second wife.
 Cornelius Nepos, a biographer and historian.
 Catullus, a poet who was in love with Clodia. The poems of Catullus included in the novel are the actual poems, although some are offered in Wilder's own translation.
 Cleopatra, queen of Egypt and mistress of Caesar.
 Cytheris, an actress of common birth, greatly admired by Caesar; she 'remade' Marc Anthony and was his lover for 15 years.
 Marc Antony, initially the lover of Cytheris, he meets and falls in love with Cleopatra over the course of the novel.
 Marcus Porcius Cato, renowned Stoic of famous integrity, leader of opposition to Caesar's dictatorship
 Servilia, former mistress of Caesar, half-sister to Cato, mother of Brutus
 Brutus, the most famous of Julius Caesar's assassins, nephew of Cato
 Porcia, wife of Brutus, daughter to Cato
 Calpurnia, third wife of Caesar.
 Suetonius was a prominent Roman historian and biographer; his (historical) account of the assassination closes the novel.

Reception
American publisher Bennett Cerf remarked at that year's meeting of the American Booksellers Association that there had been "only three novels published since the first of the year that were worth reading ... Cry, the Beloved Country, The Ides of March, and The Naked and the Dead. Wilder himself once wrote that the book was "a kind of crossword puzzle" that "only begins to speak at its second reading." Edmund Fuller called the novel "a text so rich that it requires exploration rather than reading."

References

External links
The Ides of March Plot Summary and Critical Analysis; by The Thornton Wilder Society

Novels set in ancient Rome
Novels set in the 1st century BC
1948 American novels
Epistolary novels
American historical novels
Fictional depictions of Cleopatra in literature
Fictional depictions of Julius Caesar in literature
Cultural depictions of Mark Antony
Harper & Brothers books
Cultural depictions of Cicero
Cultural depictions of Marcus Junius Brutus
Cultural depictions of Servilia (mother of Brutus)
Cultural depictions of Pompeia (wife of Caesar)
Cultural depictions of Calpurnia (wife of Caesar)
Cultural depictions of Publius Clodius Pulcher

he:אידי מארס